Ede South is a Local Government Area in Osun State, Nigeria. Its headquarters are in the town of Ede.

It has an area of 219 km and a population of 76,035 at the 2006 census.

The postal code of the area is 232.

References

Local Government Areas in Osun State